Mylène Blondel (born 29 December 1992) is a French female canoeist who won five medals at senior level of the European Wildwater Championships.

References

External links
 Mylène Blondel at Allyteams

1992 births
Living people
French female canoeists
Place of birth missing (living people)